This is an incomplete list of presidential electors in the United States presidential election of 1792.

Maryland 
All 8 electors who attended voted for George Washington and John Adams.
Western Shore
John Eager Howard
Thomas Sim Lee
Alexander Contee Hanson
Richard Potts 
William Smith, elected but did not attend
Samuel Hughes, elected but did not attend
Eastern Shore
William Richardson 
Donaldson Yates 
John Seney 
Levin Winder

New Jersey 

 Richard Stockton

Rhode Island
 Samuel J. Potter

See also 
 1792 United States presidential election

References 

 
1792